"The Zone" is a song by Canadian singer the Weeknd featuring Canadian rapper Drake. It was originally recorded for the Weeknd's 2011 mixtape Thursday, the song was later remastered and released as the third single for his 2012 album Trilogy. It was released as a digital single on November 16, 2012, by XO and Republic Records. The song serves as the first collaboration between the two artists.

Music video
The music video for "The Zone" premiered on November 7, 2012, on the Weeknd's personal YouTube account "xoxxxoooxo" and was directed by the Weeknd himself. It was later uploaded to his Vevo account the following day on November 8, 2012. Since its release, the Vevo upload of the video has been viewed over 70 million times on YouTube. The music video features a different version of the song than the original version on Thursday, and the remastered version on Trilogy. In the music video-version of the song, the Weeknd's second verse has been removed, and replaced with Drake's verse, which was the third verse in the original version. The second chorus is also longer and features the added sound of strings. There are other slight changes as well, such as the outro being different.

Personnel
Credits adapted from liner notes for Trilogy.

 The Weeknd – composer, primary artist
 Drake – featured artist
 Doc McKinney – composer, instrumentation, producer
 Carlo "Illangelo" Montagnese – composer, instrumentation, mixing, producer

Charts

Certifications

Release history

References

External links
 

2012 songs
2012 singles
The Weeknd songs
Drake (musician) songs
Song recordings produced by Illangelo
Songs written by the Weeknd
Songs written by Illangelo
Songs written by Doc McKinney
Songs written by Drake (musician)
Republic Records singles
XO (record label) singles